Babel is the debut 1993 album from D*Note. Four singles were released from the album: "Now Is The Time", "Bronx Bull", "Scheme Of Things", and "The More I See", each receiving good reviews.

Track listing
Judgement
Babel
Now Is The Time
Gimme Some Liquor
Aria
The Mandarin And The Courtesan
Rain
Bronx Bull
Omni
The More I See
Pharaoh
The Message
Lydia
Scheme Of Things
The Death Of Ntela Njonjo	0:45
D*Votion
God Bless Your South Africa	0:40

References

1993 debut albums